Xertigny is a commune in the Vosges department in Grand Est in northeastern France. Xertigny station has rail connections to Épinal, Lure and Belfort.

Population

Geography
The Côney forms most of the commune's northwestern border.

Points of interest
Arboretum de Xertigny

See also
Communes of the Vosges department

References

External links

Official site

Communes of Vosges (department)
Vosges communes articles needing translation from French Wikipedia